The 1st Supply Battalion is a battalion of the United States Marine Corps that specializes in distributing and warehousing military goods and equipment. It is based out of Marine Corps Base Camp Pendleton, California and falls under the command of the 1st Marine Logistics Group.

Subordinate units
 Headquarters and Service Company
 Ammunition Company
 Supply Company
 Medical Logistics Company

Mission
The mission of Supply Battalion is to provide general support, ground supply support, less bulk fuel, and Navy funded stock/programs and Distribution system management for the sustainment of Marine Air-Ground Task Force (MAGTF) operations.

Under the ongoing reorganization of the Corps, Combat Logistics Regiment 15 was disbanded, and the battalion joined the 1st Marine Logistics Group.

See also
History of the United States Marine Corps
List of United States Marine Corps battalions

External links
 1st Supply Battalion's official website

References

External links
 1st Supply Battalion's official website

Logistics battalions of the United States Marine Corps